Zheng Gu Shui is a traditional Chinese liniment. This external analgesic is believed to relieve qi and blood stagnation, promote healing, and soothe pain. The formula is known as Dit da jow in Cantonese or die da jiu in Mandarin. 

The liniment was used to treat fractures, broken bones and injuries suffered in combat. It is used today by practitioners of Chinese medicine to treat pain or trauma from backache, arthritis, strains, bruises, and sprains.

Zheng Gu Shui is also used by people who suffer from achy feet from long-time standing or people who suffer from Plantar Fasciitis by applying with a cotton ball and letting air dry before putting on socks and shoes. Due to its nature, it can stain clothing if not dried properly. Stains generally can be removed with a small amount of alcohol.

Contents
The ingredients in Zheng Gu Shui are listed as follows (percentages are not rounded up or down):
 Pseudoginseng 25%
 Croton seed 18%
 Cinnamon bark 13%
 Angelica root 13%
 Gentiana 12%
 Inula flower 12%
 Menthol crystal 3%
 Camphor crystal 2%

Alcohol is the base liquid to pull out the alkaloidal constituents.

References

Bibliography
Clinical Handbook  of Chinese Prepared Medicines by Chun-Han Zhu
Chinese Herbal Patent Formulas by Jake Fratkin
Traditional Chinese Medicine and the Athlete by Nicolas Miller
Oriental Materia Medica: A Concise Guide by Hong-Yen Hsu
Zheng Gu Shui's founding origins (Written in Mandarin Chinese)

Ointments